Miss Europe 2020 was the 63rd edition of the Miss Europe pageant and the fifth under the Miss Europe Organization. It was held at the Four Seasons Hotel George V Paris in Paris, France on December 22, 2020. Lara Jalloh of France, was crowned Miss Europe 2020 by out going titleholder Andrea De Las Heras of Spain.

Results

Placements

Contestants 

 - Xhensila "Xheni" Shaba
 -  Lara Jalloh
 - Marine Ayala
 - Sheida Rahni

References

External links 
 

Miss Europe
2020 beauty pageants
December 2020 events in France